332nd Engineer General Service Regiment or 332nd Engineer Regiment was activated as a Special Service Regiment in May 1942, as a unit in the United States Army. Later this unit was redesignated a General Service Regiment. The unit was formed from some regular Army officers and enlisted men, trained in the United States, then shipped overseas early in World War II to England. They were the vanguard of many others to follow, including infantry and armored troops. Their purpose was to build facilities in preparation for those to follow. After the Normandy Invasion, they followed the front lines constructing roads, railroad bridges, hospitals, and other infrastructure needed by the advancing Armies. Continuing through until surrender by Germany in 1945, the unit stayed on as part of the Army of Occupation. Many of the troops in the units were among those who were overseas for the longest periods of all in World War II.

Activation and Training

The unit formed and trained at Camp Claiborne Louisiana, in May 1942. Engineer "Special" and "General" Service Regiments would replace the old combat battalion unit structure with multipurpose skills. These large regimental units would have heavier engineer equipment, and consist of officers, non-commissioned officers and enlisted men who had experience in engineering or construction jobs. The best construction skills available in the country would be used to build these units.

The commanding officer through the formation and most of the service during World War II was Colonel Helmer Swenholt, a 1911 graduate of the University of Wisconsin–Madison.

The Chief of Army Engineers ordered Colonel Swenholt to recruit skilled personnel from construction in an organized unit. Some were recruited from Army Corps of Engineer Districts in the Omaha and Kansas City Districts. Others came from various other locations throughout the Midwest. An infantry cadre of seven officers and seventy-three enlisted men formed the nucleus of the unit in May, 1942.

Additional personnel arrived very quickly. The activities in the first months were very basic training and indoctrination into military life, since these citizen-soldiers already had experience in construction and engineering. They lived in tents and trained for six weeks in basic infantry training, including marches, rifle training, demolition training, identification of gases (e.g. mustard gas) and proper equipment, close order drill, etc. Their time at Camp Claiborne was relatively short as they were needed to ship overseas very early in the War.

Three separate trains were needed for their transfer to Camp Kilmer, a (then) new Army camp named after the American journalist and poet Joyce Kilmer. By this time the regiment had grown to full strength consisting of 1,239 men and 52 officers. They arrived at Camp Kilmer at 1655 hours on 22 July 1942.

The purpose of their time at Kilmer was to receive final medical evaluations, vaccinations, and final preparations before shipping overseas. The unit shipped overseas to England on 6 August 1942.

Deployment in the United Kingdom

Task Force #38 left 6 August 1942 bound for Greenock, Scotland in the British Isles with the USS Arkansas (BB-33) as flagship, fourteen destroyers as escorts with twelve transports including USAT Argentina, carrying the 332nd. The convoy arrived there 17 August 1942.

Upon reaching Scotland, 332nd travelled by rail to their first destination, Newport.

The 332nd initially was involved to build bases for the coming troops in preparation for the North Africa campaign and D-Day in World War II.

In their first 1–2 months they built base camps for the Regiment, first from tents but eventually to more permanent Nissen huts. Training was conducted on how to build Bailey bridges. A depot was constructed at Thatcham. This depot was designed as a staging area for the American Army for assembly and shipping of equipment, supplies and gear to the western and northern ports of the UK, where ships were loaded for North Africa.

Engineer Group
In order to concentrate engineering resources and to distribute available heavy equipment, the concept of the "engineer group" was begun. General John C. H. Lee was pleased with the work performed with the use of the special and general engineer regiments since mid-1942. These were new concepts of army organization for a new type of war. Still, there were engineers with civilian experience that knew that more improvements could be made with the engineer group idea. In this organization five or six engineer units, including regiments, dump truck companies, welding detachments and engineer maintenance companies would work together on larger projects. Some army engineer officers were lost to aviation construction battalions for runway construction. The engineer section at Southern Base Command implemented the group idea. Southern Base Engineer Group 2 was organized with Colonel Swenholt as commander 1 August 1943. There was no previous Group 1.

Invasion of Normandy
This unit served with several of the Armies of World War II as it was part of ADSEC (Advanced Section, Communications Zone). ADSEC's mission was to support the U.S. First Army, U.S. Third Army, and U.S. Seventh Army by building bridges, roads and hospitals through France, Belgium and Germany.

Railway Bridge Construction
The site of this bridge was crossing the Rhine River between Duisburg and Rheinhausen, Germany. The railroad bridge was completed 8 May 1945 and was named the "Victory Bridge".

In building the bridge, the Engineer Group had to finish the demolition of the nearby railway bridge. Near the new piers was part of a masonry bridge that looked similar to the Castle Design of the U.S. Army Corps of Engineers. This was a fitting tribute the Army Engineering.

V-2 Rocket Plans
After the end of World War II, the Occupation Zones were to be organized under the agreed terms of the Potsdam convention. Most of the German Rocket scientists and much of their equipment and plans were evacuated to American occupied areas. In order to conceal some plans from the advancing Red Army, rocket personnel had buried some of the V-2 rocket plans near Bad Sachsa, Germany.

A timetable had been set for the arrival of the Red Army into the area where the plans had been buried. A search party had been organized to recover the plans but no large scale map of the area where the plans were to be found was available to the searchers and no progress was made.

On 21 June 1945 Dr. Richard Porter and Major Robert Staver drove from the Nordhausen area to Kassel, Germany where elements of the 332nd Engineer Regiment were located.  They persuaded the regiment's executive officer to send out a search team.  "Werner Von Braun visited the 332nd regimental headquarters on Friday June 29".

Army of Occupation
The regiment remained in Germany in the Allied Occupation Zones in Germany under the command of the U.S. Fifteenth Army, later being deactivated in 1949. By May 1946 the 332nd was actively involved in rebuilding the airstrip at Wiesbaden. At the time it was known as Fliegerhorst Wiesbaden. It came to be called Wiesbaden Army Airfield (WAAF) and is still in operation today.

After V-E day, the Army was interested in conditions affecting the morale of the troops in the Occupation Zones. To meet the needs of the troops the chief of special services offered programs with recreational athletics. Soldiers could engage in boxing, football, baseball, softball, tennis, golf, track & field, badminton, bowling, swimming, archery and horseshoe pitching. These activities fell under the Army Sports Program.

Reactivation for the Korean War
In June 1950 the unit was reactivated and sent overseas during the Korean War. It was deactivated in August 1953 for the last time.

References
Specific:
 

General:
 "Bridging for Victory" by Chester Nichols

External links
 332nd Engineers web page 
 Victory Bridge at Duisburg (Archived 2009-10-22)

Engineer Regiments of the United States Army
Military units and formations established in 1942
Military units and formations disestablished in 1953